The 2016–17 Richmond Spiders men's basketball team represented the University of Richmond during the 2016–17 NCAA Division I men's basketball season. Richmond competed as a member of the Atlantic 10 Conference under 12th-year head coach Chris Mooney and played its home games at the Robins Center. They finished the regular season 19–11, 13–5 in A-10 play to finish in a tie for third place. Due to tiebreaking rules, they received the No. 3 seed in the A-10 tournament, where they defeated George Washington in the quarterfinals before losing to VCU in the semifinals. They received an invitation to the National Invitation Tournament, where, as No. 6 seed in the Iowa bracket, defeated No. 3 seed Alabama and No. 7 seed Oakland before falling to No. 4 seed TCU in the quarterfinals.

Previous season
The Spiders finished the 2015–16 season with a record of 16–16, 7–11 in A-10 play to finish in ninth place. They defeated Fordham in the second round of the A-10 tournament to advance to the Quarterfinals where they lost to Dayton.

Preseason 
Richmond was picked to finish in sixth place in the Preseason A-10 poll. T. J. Cline was selected to the Preseason All-Conference First Team while ShawnDre’ Jones was named to the Third Team.

Departures

Incoming transfers

Recruiting

Recruiting Class of 2017

Roster

Schedule and results

|-
!colspan=9 style=| Non-conference regular season

|-
!colspan=12 style=| Atlantic 10 regular season

|-
!colspan=9 style=| Atlantic 10 tournament

|-
!colspan=9 style=| NIT

Source:

References

Richmond Spiders men's basketball seasons
Richmond
Richmond Spiders men's basketball
Richmond
Richmond
Spiders basketball, men
Spiders basketball, men